North Dakota Highway 23B may refer to:

 North Dakota Highway 23B (McKenzie County)
 North Dakota Highway 23B (Mountrail County)